Japanische Kampfhörspiele, formed in 1998, is a grindcore band from Krefeld, Germany. Their name translates to "Japanese Combat Radio Plays." On later releases, they incorporated some death metal influences, but the band referred to their sound as "grindpunk". They played their farewell concert on January 29, 2011, at the Feierwerk in München, a recording of which formed their final release, the DVD Abschiedskonzert. A reunion followed in 2014.

History 
Japanische Kampfhörspiele was founded in 1998 by Klaus Nicodem and Christof Kather. Their debut CD was released in 2001 on Blutwurscht Productions. The band then added Daniel and Simon Schaffrath and Marco Bachmann to the line-up for live performances. In 2002, Japanische Kampfhörspiele released Die Großstadt Stinkt, Ist Laut Und Septisch. Simon Schaffrath left the band, and the band stopped playing live. The band focused on song-writing, and in 2003 Bastardized Recordings released the EP Fertigmensch. The band played its first live show in October 2003.

In spring 2004 the band went into the studio again to record Hardcore Aus Der Ersten Welt. Japanische Kampfhörspiele continued to record and release their music through various labels, the last being Kaputte Nackte Affen on Unundeux Records.

Current lineup
Christof Kather - drums, vocals (1998-2011, 2014-present)
Bajo - bass (2001-2011, 2014-present)
Robert Nowak - guitar (2004-2011, 2014-present)
Martin Freund - vocals (2006-2011, 2014-present)
Christian Markwald - vocals (2016-present)

Past members
Klaus Nicodem - guitar (1998-2011)
Daniel Schaffrath - guitar (2000-2004)
Simon Schaffrath - vocals (2000-2002)
Markus "Bony" Hoff - vocals (2003-2011, 2014-2016)
Andreas Paul - vocals (2003-2006)
FF - vocals (2006)
René Hauffe - guitar (2008-2011)

Discography 
 1998 - Sektion Jaka
 1999 - Le Menu De L'Autopsie Des Gagnants Du Grind Prix
 1999 - Gott Ist Satt
 2000 - Oslo
 2000 - Transportbox für Menschen
 2001 - Nostradamus In Echtzeit
 2001 - Brandsatzliebe
 2001 - Japanische Kampfhörspiele compilation album (Blutwurscht)
 2002 - Die Großstadt Stinkt, Ist Laut Und Septisch (Blutwurscht)
 2003 - Fertigmensch (Bastardized)
 2004 - Hardcore Aus Der Ersten Welt (Bastardized)
 2005 - Split with dasKRILL (Silentstagnation)
 2005 - Deutschland Von Vorne (cover album, Bastardized)
 2006 - Split with Poostew (Silentstagnation)
 2006 - Split with Bathtub Shitter (Relapse)
 2006 - Früher War Auch Nicht Alles Gut (compilation of early works)
 2007 - Rauchen und Yoga (Bastardized)
 2008 - Split with Are You God? (Baskat)
 2008 - Split with Eisenvater (Power It Up)
 2009 - Luxusvernichtung (Unundeux)
 2010 - Bilder Fressen Strom (Unundeux)
 2011 - Kaputte Nackte Affen (Unundeux)
 2011 - Abschiedskonzert (Live DVD, Unundeux)
 2014 - Welt Ohne Werbung
 2018 - Back to Ze Roots
 2019 - Verk Ferever

External links
Official band site
Japanische Kampfhörspiele on MySpace
"Luxusvernichtung {Vierundfunfzig Vertonte Kurzgedichte}" (EP/MCD) 2009 Review At Deadwebzine (Ukraine)
"Bilder Fressen Strom" (CD 2010) Review At Deadwebzine (Ukraine)
"Kaputte Nackte Affen" (CD 2011) Review At Blood or Love (America)

Musical groups established in 1998
Political music groups
German grindcore musical groups